Within law of the United Kingdom, a Statute Law Commission replaced the Statute Law Board on 29 August 1854.

Recommendations made by the Commission of 1854 were implemented by the 19 & 20 Vict c 64.

See also
Charles Henry Bellenden Ker

References

Legal organisations based in the United Kingdom
1854 establishments in the United Kingdom
Organizations established in 1854